Gembloux Agro-Bio Tech (GxABT), located in Gembloux, Belgium, is one of the eleven faculties of the University of Liège. Founded in 1860 and previously known as the Faculté universitaire des sciences agronomiques de Gembloux (FUSAGx, French for: Gembloux Agronomical University), it is Belgium's oldest educational and research institution dedicated to agronomic sciences and biological engineering. It is the only school in Belgium to be accredited by the French Commission des Titres d'Ingénieur allowing the university to deliver the Diplôme d'Ingénieur engineering degree. The school is also accredited by the EUR-ACE label, the highest European quality label for engineering degree programmes at Bachelor and Master level.

Prior to 2009, it was an independent public university of the French Community of Belgium.

History
The university is housed in the historical Abbey of Gembloux, which was founded around 940. After the French Revolution, monks were expelled, and the abbey was sold. In July 1860, the agronomic school of Thourout is transferred in Gembloux, founding the Gembloux Agricultural Institute. The Belgian State definitely buys the abbey in 1881 and in 1920, the school is renamed into the State Agricultural Institute (Institut agronomique de l'État). The name is changed again in 1965 into the State University of Agricultural Sciences (Faculté universitaire des sciences agronomiques de l’État) and again in 1994 into the Gembloux University of Agricultural Sciences (Faculté universitaire des sciences agronomiques de Gembloux) after its administration was transferred from the Federal State to the French Community of Belgium.

In 2009, it was merged with the University of Liège and renamed to Gembloux Agro-Bio Tech (GxABT). Its official language has always been French.

Studies
At the cutting edge of sustainable development and eco-innovation, the Faculty of Gembloux Agro-Bio Tech is dedicated exclusively to agronomic sciences and biological engineering. The five-year program on offer at the Faculty trains bioengineers in the making.  Students can choose a specialization from among four different courses of study in the field of life sciences: 
Environmental science and technology
Forest and natural space management 
Agronomic science
Chemistry and bioindustries

Gembloux Agro Bio Tech also organizes the first year of the bachelor's program in Landscape architecture, in partnership with the Haute École Charlemagne and the Institute of Architecture of La Cambre.

See also
 Crealys Science Park
 Science and technology in Wallonia
 Science Parks of Wallonia

References

Sources

 Gembloux Agricultural University 

Universities in Belgium
Forestry education
Forestry in Belgium
Gembloux